was a Japanese samurai and commander of the Sengoku period who served the Mōri clan.  He was in charge of the conquest of mainly the San'in region and often fought together with Kikkawa Motoharu.

References

Samurai
1533 births
1582 deaths
Mōri clan